Bevier may refer to:

People
 Caly Bevier (aka Calysta), singer and contestant on America's Got Talent
 Isabel Bevier (1860-1942), Home Economics scholar.
 Lillian BeVier, a professor of law at The University of Virginia School of Law
 Lottie Gertrude Bevier, maiden name of Trudy Stevenson, a Zimbabwean politician
 Robert Bevier (1834-1889), colonel in Confederate Army

Places
 Bevier, Kentucky
 Bevier, Missouri

Structures
 Bevier-Elting House, home in the Huguenot Street Historic District in New Paltz, New York
 Bevier Hall, an academic building at University of Illinois at Urbana-Champaign
 Bevier Hall is a dormitory building on the State University of New York at New Paltz campus
 Bevier House Museum, Marbletown, New York
 Bevier and Southern Railroad, a United States railroad that existed from 1914 to 1982 
 George M. Bevier Engineering Library, a library in the academic building Benedum Hall at the University of Pittsburgh

See also
 Bevy (disambiguation)